Ōkaihau is a small town in the Northland Region of New Zealand's North Island, just north of Kaikohe. State Highway 1 passes through Ōkaihau making it fairly busy.  Ōkaihau has a primary school (Ōkaihau Primary School) and a secondary school (Okaihau College).

The New Zealand Ministry for Culture and Heritage gives a translation of "place of feast of the winds" for Ōkaihau.

History

Ōkaihau was a Māori village when the settlers arrived on the ridge which stands between Lake Ōmāpere and the Hokianga harbour. It was the northernmost point for the railway. Ōkaihau was very busy during early to mid 20th century, but the removal of the railway stopped the business and tourist flow.

Transport 

On 29 October 1923, a branch line railway was opened to Ōkaihau from the junction with the North Auckland Line at Otiria. Work on an extension of the line beyond Ōkaihau to the Hokianga Harbour and Kaitaia proceeded slowly, and in 1936, the line was essentially complete to Rangiahua. However, it was decided that construction beyond Rangiahua would be excessively expensive and the steep section from Ōkaihau to Rangiahua was seen as unnecessary and accordingly removed. The railway line thus became known as the Okaihau Branch and Ōkaihau became New Zealand's northernmost railway terminus. With Ōkaihau being on the main State Highway north (SH1) it became the transshipping point for goods from rail onto road and vice versa.

For the Ōkaihau Branch's first few decades of operation, passengers were catered for by mixed trains that carried freight as well and ran to slow timetables. These mixed services offered connections with the Northland Express passenger train that ran thrice weekly between Auckland and Opua, but in November 1956, the carriage train was replaced by a railcar service run by RM class 88 seaters. The northern terminus was changed from Opua to Ōkaihau, and the railway line rose in prominence and importance. The railcars provided a considerable improvement in service and were very popular throughout their service duration. However, mechanical faults plagued the railcars and they were cancelled in July 1967. Mixed trains continued to operate to Whangarei until 21 June 1976, when the line became freight-only. However, declining freight volumes due to deregulation of the transport industry in 1983 meant that the line did not last much longer, and it closed on 1 November 1987.

Today, the Ōkaihau railway station platform edge remains in its former location beside a flat area that was once the railway yard, and just to the north of the town is a tunnel on the ill-fated section to Rangiahua, New Zealand's northernmost railway tunnel.

There have been calls and proposals to reopen the Ōkaihau Branch to carry forestry traffic but to date nothing has yet come to fruition.

Demographics
Statistics New Zealand describes Ōkaihau as a rural settlement. The settlement is part of the larger Ōkaihau statistical area.

The settlement had a population of 324 at the 2018 New Zealand census, an increase of 12 people (3.8%) since the 2013 census, and a decrease of 36 people (−10.0%) since the 2006 census. There were 117 households, comprising 171 males and 156 females, giving a sex ratio of 1.1 males per female, with 66 people (20.4%) aged under 15 years, 54 (16.7%) aged 15 to 29, 156 (48.1%) aged 30 to 64, and 48 (14.8%) aged 65 or older.
Ethnicities were 57.4% European/Pākehā, 51.9% Māori, 7.4% Pacific peoples, 1.9% Asian, and 0.9% other ethnicities. People may identify with more than one ethnicity.

Although some people chose not to answer the census's question about religious affiliation, 43.5% had no religion, 33.3% were Christian, 5.6% had Māori religious beliefs, 0.9% were Hindu, 0.9% were Buddhist and 0.9% had other religions.

Of those at least 15 years old, 30 (11.6%) people had a bachelor's or higher degree, and 60 (23.3%) people had no formal qualifications. 21 people (8.1%) earned over $70,000 compared to 17.2% nationally. The employment status of those at least 15 was that 120 (46.5%) people were employed full-time, 33 (12.8%) were part-time, and 18 (7.0%) were unemployed.

Ōkaihau statistical area

Ōkaihau statistical area had a population of 1,236 at the 2018 New Zealand census, an increase of 105 people (9.3%) since the 2013 census, and an increase of 159 people (14.8%) since the 2006 census. There were 435 households, comprising 636 males and 597 females, giving a sex ratio of 1.07 males per female. The median age was 40.6 years (compared with 37.4 years nationally), with 261 people (21.1%) aged under 15 years, 234 (18.9%) aged 15 to 29, 576 (46.6%) aged 30 to 64, and 162 (13.1%) aged 65 or older.

Ethnicities were 75.5% European/Pākehā, 37.1% Māori, 4.6% Pacific peoples, 1.2% Asian, and 1.5% other ethnicities. People may identify with more than one ethnicity.

The percentage of people born overseas was 13.1, compared with 27.1% nationally.

Although some people chose not to answer the census's question about religious affiliation, 51.2% had no religion, 32.5% were Christian, 4.6% had Māori religious beliefs, 0.5% were Hindu, 0.5% were Buddhist and 1.2% had other religions.

Of those at least 15 years old, 120 (12.3%) people had a bachelor's or higher degree, and 198 (20.3%) people had no formal qualifications. The median income was $27,300, compared with $31,800 nationally. 108 people (11.1%) earned over $70,000 compared to 17.2% nationally. The employment status of those at least 15 was that 501 (51.4%) people were employed full-time, 138 (14.2%) were part-time, and 42 (4.3%) were unemployed.

Education

History 

The earliest official record of a school in Ōkaihau was in 1874, prior to this, school had been taught by Mr. Joseph Harrison from 1870 or 1871. The earliest date is not known. The settlers, through Mr. McCloud the M.P for the Bay of Islands at the time arranged to provide the timber for a school and the government would erect it and pay the teacher in full. The school was built in 1874, opening with a roll of 21 pupils.

By 1889 the school building was too small and was shifted down to serve as the Upper Waihou School. A larger one was built in its place. This bigger school was known continuously as the "Main School" until consolidation over forty years later. Other schools opened in the area at later dates were; Upper Waihou, Rangi Point, Cooks Road, Utakura, Okaihau East and Okaihau Public Works School. Due to the large influx of workers on the proposed railway line to Kaitaia the Public Works School became necessary. It grew to have three teachers.

Prior to 1938 there was no secondary education available to those in the Ōkaihau area. Students would either have to board in Auckland or Whangarei, or travel to Kaikohe by train. The trip to Kaikohe was an endurance test for students as they would often not get home until 6pm or later. On 4 April 1938 a consolidated school was opened with a roll of 180. The first headmaster was Mr. A. Burnett.

In 1947 the roll had increased to such an extent the Consolidated School became a District High School and with the addition of two prefabricated buildings served as both primary and secondary schools. The first headmaster was Mr. J. Lee and Mr. T. Batty assisted in the High School department. Further expansion took place in 1963 when a separate Infant Block was erected across the road from the Main School.

Okaihau College

In 1973 the High School was granted Form 1–7 (Year 7–13) status and became Okaihau College with Mr. Laurenson as first principal. At the same time a full primary school was completed around the Infant Block with Mr. N. Thomson becoming the first headmaster. At the end of 1973 there were 263 pupils attending the college and 219 at the primary school.

Okaihau College has grown to a current student roll of  students.

Okaihau Primary School
Okaihau Primary School caters for children between Years 1 and 6 and has a roll of  students.

Present

Ōkaihau village has a butchery, cafes, a mechanics, two dairies, a Four Square and a takeaways.

Name
The name "Ōkaihau" is a Maori name meaning "Feast of the winds", which is relevant to the location of the area on a ridge over 200 m above sea level. This part of New Zealand was originally a dense wooded landscape and even today huge old trees such as puriri are found in the area of the school.

Notes

References
 Okaihau community profile

External links
 Okaihau School website

Far North District
Populated places in the Northland Region